Robert L. Bondurant (April 27, 1933 – November 12, 2021) was an American racecar driver who raced for the Shelby American, Ferrari, and Eagle teams. Bondurant was one of the most famous drivers to emerge from the Southern California road racing scene in the 1950s, and achieved success in North America and in Europe. His Bob Bondurant School of High Performance Driving has been responsible for training generations of American racing drivers.

Career
Bondurant was born in Evanston, Illinois. During his teens, Bondurant raced an Indian motorcycle on dirt ovals. In 1956 he switched to sports car racing with a Morgan and started to attract attention when he won the West Coast "B" production Championship, in a Chevrolet Corvette winning 18 out of 20 races.

Santa Barbara Chevrolet dealer Shelly Washburn hired Bondurant in 1961 to drive his #614 1959 Corvette. Some of the best Corvette racing duels were between him and David McDonald on the West Coast during the early 1960s.  At the L.A. Times Grand Prix in October 1962, Bondurant drove Washburn's new 1963 Corvette Z06 Stingray. Between 1961 and 1963, he won 30 out of 32 races in Washburn's Corvettes.

In 1963 he became a member of Carroll Shelby's Ford Cobra team, winning his first race at the Continental Divide Raceway in Colorado, followed by an overall win at the LA Times Grand Prix GT race at Riverside in October 1963. For the 1964 FIA season after finishing 2nd in GT at Sebring, Bondurant was in Europe racing the new 289 FIA Cobras at the Targa Florio, Spa, and Nurburgring. His best-known victory was winning the GT class at Le Mans 24 Hours in 1964 in Shelby's new Cobra Daytona Coupe with Dan Gurney co-driving. In 1965 Bondurant won the FIA Manufacturers' World Championship for Shelby American and Ford, winning seven out of ten races against the class dominating Ferrari 250 GTOs in Europe. In the same year he drove a works Ferrari Formula 1 car during the United States Grand Prix at Watkins Glen, and handled a Lotus 33 for Reg Parnell at the following Mexican race.

In 1966 Bondurant served as a technical consultant for John Frankenheimer's film Grand Prix and trained the film's lead actor James Garner to drive Formula cars in the race sequences. Bondurant was one of two drivers (alongside Graham Hill) to help extricate Jackie Stewart from his fuel-leaking wrecked car during the 1966 Belgian Grand Prix, the incident that led to Stewart's crusade for motor racing safety. Bondurant also drove BRMs in five Grands Prix for Team Chamaco Collect, finishing 4th at Monaco.  He finished the Formula One season in North America in two races, driving an Eagle for Dan Gurney's Anglo American Racers.

For 1967 he drove in the CanAm series and in a Corvette L88 Coupe at Le Mans. At Le Mans he led the GT class until a wrist pin failed putting the car out in the early morning. Later that month while driving a McLaren, at Watkins Glen, the steering arm broke at 150 mph approaching the Loop-Chute section of Watkins Glen (the current Turn 5, but without the bus stop, which was installed in 1992). Bondurant sustained serious rib, leg, foot and, most seriously, back injuries in the subsequent accident in which his car flipped eight times. Doctors told him he would likely never walk again, but through courage and hard work he overcame his injuries.

While recuperating, Bondurant drafted an idea for a high performance driving school borrowing from the experiences he had while training James Garner for Grand Prix. The Bob Bondurant School of High Performance Driving opened in early 1968 at Orange County International Raceway then moved to Ontario and then to Sonoma, where he was an important figure in the track's development. Nissan Motor Company (under Datsun name in the U.S.) was Bondurant's sponsoring partner in his school from its beginning, and continued in that role at the Sonoma Raceway driving school.

In the June 1969 run of the grueling offroad Baja 500 race, Bondurant with co-driver Tony Murphy took first place in the passenger car class driving an SC/Rambler for James Garner's "American International Racers" team that was sponsored by American Motors Corporation (AMC). 

Bondurant had four NASCAR starts, all at Riverside International Raceway, with his highest finish of 18th in 1981.

Following the 1989 Loma Prieta earthquake he moved the driving school to Phoenix, Arizona, where he enjoyed close ties to General Motors and Goodyear Tires.

Bondurant was a driving instructor to actors James Garner, Paul Newman, Clint Eastwood, Robert Wagner, Tim Allen, Tom Cruise, and Nicolas Cage.

Award
Bondurant was inducted in the Motorsports Hall of Fame of America in 2003.

Death
Bondurant died in Paradise Valley, Arizona, on November 12, 2021, at the age of 88. He is survived by his wife Pat.

A statement on his death reads, in part, "Bondurant is the only American to bring home the World Championship trophy back to the U.S. while racing for Carroll Shelby. He won his class at Le Mans and has been inducted into ten motorsports halls of fame. Bondurant Racing School was founded in 1968 and has graduated celebrities for car movies like James Garner, Paul Newman, Tom Cruise, Nicolas Cage, and Christian Bale, along with over 500,000 graduates from around the world. His legacy will remain with us forever."

Racing record

SCCA National Championship Runoffs

Complete Formula One World Championship results
(key)

Formula One Non-Championship results
(key) (Races in bold indicate pole position; races in italics indicate fastest lap)

Complete 24 Hours of Le Mans results

References

External links
 Bondurant Racing School
 Bondurant Kart Racing School
 Bondurant Driving & Racing School Programs
 The Bondurant Methodology
Bob Bondurant America's uncrowned World Driving Champion (2007, Editions Cotty)
Bob Bondurant Des Cobra à la Formule1 la meme passion (2008, Editions Cotty)

1933 births
2021 deaths
American Formula One drivers
24 Hours of Le Mans drivers
12 Hours of Reims drivers
Trans-Am Series drivers
Sportspeople from Evanston, Illinois
Racing drivers from Illinois
North American Racing Team Formula One drivers
Reg Parnell Racing Formula One drivers
Anglo American Racers Formula One drivers
World Sportscar Championship drivers
SCCA National Championship Runoffs participants